Duke Ding of Jin (died 475 BC) was from 511 to 475 BC the ruler of the state of Jin, a major power during the Spring and Autumn period of ancient China. His ancestral name was Ji, given name Wu, and Duke Ding was his posthumous title.  He succeeded his father, Duke Qing of Jin, who died in 512 BC.

War of the clans
After the extermination of the Luan clan by Duke Ding's great-grandfather Duke Ping, the state of Jin had been dominated by the six powerful clans – Fan, Han, Zhao, Wei, Zhonghang, and Zhi.  In 497 BC a dispute broke out between Zhao Yang (趙鞅), the leader of the Zhao clan, and the Fan and Zhonghang clans.  The Fan and Zhonghang forces attacked Zhao, and the three other clans – Han, Wei, and Zhi – came to Zhao's defence and attacked Fan and Zhonghang, who were defeated and forced to retreat to the city of Zhaoge.  Seven years later, in 490 BC the combined Jin forces decisively defeated the Fan and Zhonghang clans, whose leaders Fan Jishe and Zhonghang Yin fled to the State of Qi.  From then on Jin would be dominated by the remaining four clans, three of which would partition Jin into the new states of Han, Zhao, and Wei during the reign of Duke Ding's son Duke Chu of Jin.

Bid for hegemony
Despite the civil war, Jin was still one of the most powerful states of China.  In 482 BC, the monarchs of many states met at Huangchi (黃池) in the State of Song, where Duke Ding vied with Fuchai, king of the State of Wu, for the title of Hegemon.  The outcome was disputed: Zuo Zhuan says Duke Ding won, while Guoyu and Gongyang Zhuan record victory by Fuchai.

Death and succession
Duke Ding reigned for 37 years and died in 475 BC.  He was succeeded by his son, Duke Chu of Jin.

References

Year of birth unknown
Monarchs of Jin (Chinese state)
6th-century BC Chinese monarchs
5th-century BC Chinese monarchs
475 BC deaths